Luna 4, or E-6 No.4 (Ye-6 series), sometimes known in the West as Sputnik 26, was a Soviet spacecraft launched as part of the Luna program to attempt the first soft landing on the Moon. Following a successful launch, the spacecraft failed to perform a course correction and as a result it missed the Moon, remaining instead in Earth orbit.

Mission
Luna 4 was launched by a Molniya-L carrier rocket at 08:16:37 UTC on April 2, 1963. Launch occurred from Site 1/5 at the Baikonur Cosmodrome.

It then entered a barycentric 90,000 × 700,000 km Earth orbit. A lecture program entitled Hitting the Moon was scheduled to be broadcast on Radio Moscow at 7:45 p.m. the evening of April 5 but was cancelled. The spacecraft transmitted at 183.6 MHz at least until April 6.

Lunar surface close-up photography
The purpose of this experiment was to obtain information on the characteristics of the lunar surface. These characteristics included the amount of cratering, structure and size of craters, the amount, distribution, and sizes of ejecta, mechanical properties of the surface such as bearing strength, cohesiveness, compaction, etc. Determination and recognition of processes operating to produce the lunar surface features also were among the objectives of this photographic experiment.

References

External links

 Zarya - Luna programme chronology

Luna 04
Spacecraft launched in 1963
1963 in the Soviet Union